Carex rostrata, the bottle sedge or beaked sedge, is a perennial species of sedge in the family Cyperaceae.

Range and habitat
The species is native to Holarctic fens and can be found in Canada and the northern part of the United States, and most of Europe, including Britain, north to 71° N, and W. Asia, in wet peaty places with a high water table.

References

rostrata
Plants described in 1787
Flora of North America